Scotswood can refer to:
Benwell and Scotswood
Scotswood Railway Bridge
Scotswood railway station
Scotswood Bridge

Scotswood